Akhbar el-Yom is an Arabic language weekly newspaper published in Egypt.

History and profile
Akhbar el-Yom was founded by the Amin brothers, Mustafa Amin and Ali Amin, on 6 November 1944. The paper is released weekly on Saturdays. The newspaper is owned by the Egyptian Shura Council and considered a semi-official newspaper. It has a daily edition called al-Akhbar, which was also established by the Amin brothers.

The circulation of the paper in 2000 was 1.5 million copies.

See also
List of newspapers in Egypt

References

External links
 

1944 establishments in Egypt
Arabic-language newspapers
Newspapers published in Cairo
Publications established in 1944
Weekly newspapers published in Egypt